Acacia papulosa is a shrub of the genus Acacia and the subgenus Plurinerves that is endemic to a small area along the south coast of south western Australia.

Description
Like most species of Acacia it has phyllodes rather than true leaves. It blooms from August to September and produces yellow flowers.

Distribution
It is native to three small areas along the southern coast in the Great Southern and Goldfields-Esperance regions of Western Australia where it is found growing in areas of spongolitic loam. The shrub has a limited distribution in the Boxwood Hill area and in the Fitzgerald River National Park area as a part of woodland communities.

See also
 List of Acacia species

References

papulosa
Acacias of Western Australia
Taxa named by Bruce Maslin
Plants described in 1995